James Driskell "Fats" Lawrence (January 21, 1903 – March 8, 1971) was an All-Southern college football center for the Auburn Tigers of Auburn University. Lawrence was captain in his senior year of 1924. Upon graduation the Glomerata, the school's yearbook, writes "Fats was a real leader, a hard worker, a quick thinker, and a clean player; in other words, an ideal football man, and Auburn will have a hard time finding a center to fill his shoes."

Early years
James Driskell Lawrence was born on January 21, 1903, in Plantersville, Alabama to Charles Lawrence and Salliego Driskell Todd.

References

1903 births
1971 deaths
American football centers
People from Dallas County, Alabama
Players of American football from Alabama
Auburn Tigers football players
All-Southern college football players